Adam Kompała (born 16 August 1973 in Ruda Śląska) is a former Polish footballer who played as a midfielder.

External links
 

1973 births
Living people
Polish footballers
Association football midfielders
Górnik Zabrze players
Ruch Radzionków players
Szczakowianka Jaworzno players
Podbeskidzie Bielsko-Biała players
Jagiellonia Białystok players
Piast Gliwice players
Ekstraklasa players
Sportspeople from Ruda Śląska